Robert Doran (born 1940) is a scholar of religion, particularly early Christianity and Hellenistic Judaism.  He held a position of professor of Religion and European Studies at Amherst College in Massachusetts and took emeritus status in 2020.  At Amherst, he had the named chair of Samuel Williston Professor of Greek and Hebrew.

His areas of research include the book 2 Maccabees, which he has published several works and commentaries on, as well as Syrian Christianity including the saint Simeon Stylites and the Edessan community.  He has also published on the lost works of Hellenistic era Jewish writers and historians such as Aristeas the Exegete, Pseudo-Eupolemus, Cleodemus Malchus, and Pseudo-Hecataeus.  He has also served as an editor at Catholic Biblical Quarterly.

Personal life
Doran earned his Doctorate of Theology from Harvard Divinity School where he studied under John Strugnell among others.    Doran's wife, Susan Niditch, is also a professor of Religion at Amherst College and also attended Harvard; they were both appointed to tenure-track positions at Amherst in 1978.

Works
Books
 
 
 
 
 

Selected sections in larger works

References

External links
 
 

Living people
1940 births
Amherst College faculty
Harvard Divinity School alumni
Christian scholars